The 1912 European Rowing Championships were rowing championships held on Lake Geneva in the Swiss city of Geneva. The competition was for men only and they competed in five boat classes (M1x, M2x, M2+, M4+, M8+). The 1912 Olympic rowing competition had been held a month earlier in Stockholm, Sweden.

Medal summary

References

European Rowing Championships
European Rowing Championships
Rowing
Rowing
European Rowing Championships
Sports competitions in Geneva